Sarah Elizabeth Dines (born 27 May 1965) is a British Conservative Party politician. She has been Member of Parliament (MP) for Derbyshire Dales since the 2019 general election. She has been serving Parliamentary Under-Secretary of State for Safeguarding since October 2022. She served as Lord Commissioner of the Treasury from September to October 2022.

Early life and career
Dines was born in Billericay, and raised in Basildon, Essex.

Her parents, Elizabeth (née Dale) and Tony Dines, were tenant farmers until their tenancy was ended and their farm was taken from them to form part of what then became Basildon new town. Her mother served as a Conservative councillor on Basildon District Council and subsequently on Maldon Town Council, Maldon District Council and Essex County Council.

Dines attended Chalvedon comprehensive school and completed her A Levels at Basildon College. She studied at Brunel University from 1983 to 1987, and at the Inns of Court School of Law between 1987 and 1988. She is a member of Lincoln's Inn and was called to the Bar in July 1988.

Legal career 
She worked as a family law practitioner, latterly at 3 Paper Buildings, dealing with divorce, including complex financial and business assets, care, adoption, international child law and child abduction and related issues. She is a member of the Family Law Bar Association and the British Academy of Forensic Sciences.

Political career
Dines has been a lifelong Conservative, joining the Conservative Party as a teenager; she was chairman of the Basildon Young Conservatives. While at university, she was chairman of the Brunel University Conservative Association, and Secretary of the London Conservative Students. She also worked as a parliamentary researcher for MP Sir George Gardiner.

At the age of 21, she was elected to Basildon District Council, representing Burstead ward from 1987 to 1991. She unsuccessfully contested the seat of Belfast East at the 1997 general election.

Dines was elected as Member of Parliament for the Derbyshire Dales constituency at the 2019 general election with 29,356 votes, a majority of 17,381.

Shortly after her election, Dines was appointed Parliamentary Private Secretary to the Secretary of State for Northern Ireland.

On 17 September 2021, Dines was appointed Parliamentary Private Secretary to the Prime Minister Boris Johnson, alongside Andrew Griffith, in the second cabinet reshuffle of the second Johnson ministry.

In the February 2022 reshuffle, she was appointed as an Assistant Government Whip.

In July 2022, Dines was criticised for her handling of allegations involving the then Deputy Chief Whip, Chris Pincher. Dines, in her capacity as Assistant Government Whip, asked a man, who claimed Pincher groped him, if he was gay; when the alleged victim replied that he was gay, Dines was said to have replied "Well that doesn't make it straightforward". Responding to these claims, Dines said these press reports were inaccurate, and that: "The conversation I had with the subject of the alleged sexual harassment on the night was aimed at securing the full facts of what had transpired and was part of a much wider discussion which led to immediate action following the events of that evening."

Parliamentary career

In her maiden speech in the House of Commons on 17 March 2020, Dines said: "I am a working-class, council [house]-reared, comprehensive school-educated Conservative". Dines mentioned that her mother canvassed with her in the pram, that she delivered her first Conservative party leaflet at the age of 8 and at the age of 17 was on the committee that selected David Amess as the then prospective Conservative parliamentary candidate for Basildon. She went on to say that her personal heroes were Margaret Thatcher and those who paved the way for Thatcher, the parliamentarians Airey Neave and Ian Gow. She also mentioned former MI6 director Sir Maurice Oldfield, who had been born in her constituency, and "our intelligence and security services, which are often the unsung heroes of battles fought in the twilight and dark, and in the cold."

In March 2020, Dines was elected as a member of the Justice Select Committee. In June 2021, she was also appointed to serve on the Northern Ireland (Ministers, Elections and Petitions of Concern) Bill.

On 2 March 2021, she was appointed to the ad hoc Select Committee on the Armed Forces Bill.

In December 2020, the Sunday Times published an article reporting that Dines had been claiming expenses for hotel accommodation located near to her parliamentary office despite owning six properties in total, worth approximately £5 million. The newspaper accused Dines of "charging the taxpayer thousands of pounds for regular stays at a four-star hotel". A spokesman for Dines responded, stating: "Sarah has conformed to all the necessary processes for declaring her interests. Any expense claims she has made have been in line with the instructions set out by the Independent Parliamentary Standards Authority. Sarah is a reluctant user of hotels and only stays in hotels in London when her parliamentary and departmental responsibilities have kept her working late at Westminster." 

Dines is a member of numerous All-Party Parliamentary Groups, including Policing and Security, Environment, Pacific Islands and Norfolk Island, Sovereign Defence Manufacturing Capability, Legal and Constitutional Affairs, Farming, Peak District, Trade and Export Promotion, Rural Business, Small and Micro Business, Caribbean, Commonwealth, Ireland and the Irish in Britain, Social Media, Women in Parliament and Endometriosis. She is a member of the British-Irish Parliamentary Assembly.

Dines has a particular interest in the Armed Forces and veterans and is a member of the Armed Forces, Armed Forces Covenant and Veterans All-Party Parliamentary Groups.

Political beliefs 
Dines is on the centre-right of the Conservative Party. She is a supporter of the Blue Collar Conservatism group in Parliament, which exists to "champion working people". In her maiden speech, Dines stated: "My politics are simple: I am instinctively cautious of the encroachment of the state into the lives of everyday people."

She has been a long-time Eurosceptic, and was listed as such when she was the Conservative candidate in East Belfast. She supported Brexit in the 2016 EU membership referendum, and is a member of the European Research Group.

During the 2019 general election campaign she said that her priorities were to "get Brexit done", preserving the environment and better digital connectivity within the constituency. She declared herself to be "passionately committed to the countryside and the environment". She stated that "people need to vote blue to be green."

On 20 December 2019, she signed the Early Day Motion calling for Big Ben to chime on the day of Brexit. Dines is a member of the 'Vote Blue, Go Green' movement within the Conservative Party.

Dines is a member of the Armed Forces, Armed Forces Covenant and Veterans All-Party Parliamentary Groups.

Dines was one of the Conservative MPs calling for the BBC to reconsider its decision not to play "Rule, Britannia!" and "Land of Hope and Glory" at the Last Night of the Proms, a decision that was ultimately reversed. She said: "I am proud to be British, as are my constituents. Anthems of our nation are poignant and mean so much more today, than a reference to the historical time they were written in. We should be proud of history and recognise and learn from any mistakes of the past."

Dines has spoken out on the "truly despicable online abuse" to which parliamentarians have been subjected, stating that "attacks on physical appearance, seems to be predominantly aimed at women MPs".

Dines said that some of the abuse she had received had to be dealt with by the police, and that in one case an online abuser admitted the crime of harassment and had accepted a police caution. She said: "There is a false belief that things that are said on social media, that people would never dream of saying to another in person are somehow different to real life harassment and abuse – it isn't. Harassment on social media and in real life are the same, they are awful, in some cases unlawful, and have no place in our society."

Constituency campaigns 
Dines has raised the issue of funding for Ashbourne's long-awaited A515 bypass, stating: "For over 100 years, in one form or another, the Ashbourne bypass in Derbyshire Dales has been endlessly discussed, debated, consulted on and promised".

She has also been vocal on the need to address flooding concerns with her constituency. Following severe flooding in Bakewell and Matlock in 2021 and 2022, Dines campaigned for a lasting solution to the problem.

Dines has stood for local businesses within Derbyshire Dales, including farming, tourist attractions, quarrying, the hospitality industry, leisure centres, cheese, and distilleries.

She has called for the police station in Bakewell to be reopened. During the COVID-19 lockdown, she fought for churches in her constituency to remain open and headed the campaign for cricket clubs to reopen within the Derbyshire Dales.

She has repeatedly pressed Derbyshire Dales District Council to fulfil its statutory obligation to provide a traveller site within Derbyshire Dales: “To not have a permanent site, we are not only failing residents, but also the traveller community."

Personal life
Dines has four adult sons. Her husband is David Hoile, a public relations adviser. She owns six properties, including one in Whitechapel, London, and land, altogether worth an estimated £5 million, according to The Times.

Dines is a former member of the First Aid Nursing Yeomanry (Princess Royal's Volunteer Corps), and has drawn attention to the unit's role during the coronavirus pandemic. She is a member of the Royal British Legion and the Ashbourne Ex-Servicemen's Club.

Dines was taken ill with coronavirus in March 2020. She said: "I have to say, there were a lot of people worse off than me. I had it moderately, and it was very, very unpleasant and quite frightening."

References

External links

Year of birth missing (living people)
Living people
Conservative Party (UK) MPs for English constituencies
Female members of the Parliament of the United Kingdom for English constituencies
Members of the Parliament of the United Kingdom for constituencies in Derbyshire
UK MPs 2019–present
21st-century British women politicians
Alumni of Brunel University London
English barristers
English women lawyers
1960s births
21st-century English women
21st-century English people
Parliamentary Private Secretaries to the Prime Minister